Pensilva is a village in the civil parish of St Ive and Pensilva, in east Cornwall, England, United Kingdom. It is at  about four miles (6 km) northeast of Liskeard. Nearby settlements include Charaton Cross and Middlehill.

The original small settlement grew quickly during the nineteenth century in response to industrial activity on the moorland north and west of the village. There is a Church of England chapel of St John (a chapel-of-ease to St Ive).

The village centre is about a mile from the edge of Bodmin Moor at Caradon Hill, on top of which is a large mast for the transmission for TV signals to the area. Caradon Hill is heavy with ancient mineshafts and engine houses dating from the 1900s wherein various ores of tin, zinc and arsenic were mined.

Pensilva is not generally considered a destination for tourists although nearby Minions has some historical attractions in the form of The Cheesewring—a stone monument at the head of a quarry—and The Hurlers, a set of standing stones. Caradon Hill with all its mine workings and open country is always worth a walk. As you approach the top of the hill, you can see parts of Plymouth and the Tamar estuary and further along the coast you can see the sea in the South. Sheep, cows and horses roam free on the hill and surrounding roads.

There is one general-grocery shop in the middle of the village.

The local pub in Minions—The Cheesewring—burnt down on Christmas Eve 2021. Other nearby pubs are The Wheal Tor and The Crows Nest. As of 26 December 2022, the Victoria Inn, the village pub, has closed permanently, presumably as the land has greater value as flats and apartments; building work has already started on the periphery.

The Millennium House in Pensilva is a community owned social centre built in 1999. Over the years it has waxed and waned in popularity and the incumbent small bar has changed from a club to a pub in that time. It is the location of the part-time Post Office and a volunteer-run café is open during PO hours. 

The current millennium house holds a small donation run library and a small weekly youth club, along with other rooms that can be booked for clubs meetings and other social events. The millennium also holds a small games room where a let pool table is housed along with the local league skittle games.

References

External links

Charaton Cross, Cornwall; Explore Britain

Villages in Cornwall